Luxapalila Creek (also spelled Luxapallila Creek) is a  stream in Mississippi and Alabama in the United States. Luxapalila means "flying turtle" in the Choctaw language.

It runs through the Alabama cities of  Winfield, Millport, Kennedy, Fayette, and Columbus, Mississippi.

Its tributaries are Cut Bank Creek, Hell's Creek, Magby Creek, Mud Creek, Wilson Creek, and Yellow Creek.

See also
List of rivers of Alabama
List of rivers of Mississippi

References

Rivers of Mississippi
Rivers of Alabama
Tributaries of the Tombigbee River
Rivers of Lamar County, Alabama
Rivers of Marion County, Alabama
Rivers of Fayette County, Alabama
Rivers of Pickens County, Alabama
Rivers of Monroe County, Mississippi
Rivers of Lowndes County, Mississippi
Mississippi placenames of Native American origin
Alabama placenames of Native American origin